Major General Mohammed Said Hersi Morgan, also known as General Morgan or Colonel Morgan, is a Somali military and faction leader. He was the son-in-law of Siad Barre and Minister of Defence of Somalia. He hails from the Mejerteen Darood clan .

Career

Siad Barre Government
Morgan received his military training in Italy and the USA. As a colonel, he was commander of the Mogadishu sector, where the elite units of the Armed Forces were stationed (ca. 1980); this was probably Sector 77.

Morgan then went on to become commander of the Red Berets, responsible for the suppression of the revolt of the Majerteen United in the Somali Salvation Democratic Front (SSDF) in 1982. From 1986 to 1988, as a general, he was the military commander of the 26th Sector (the region of Somaliland) and in September 1990 he was appointed as minister of defense and substitute head of state.

Somali Civil War

Before the fall of the government and the subsequent 1991 civil war, Morgan was recognized as a state-sponsored war criminal. Morgan was one of the main government officials who spearheaded the state sponsored genocide in Somaliland against the Isaaq clan. This information has been thoroughly documented by Human Rights Watch. Morgan has yet to be tried by the international courts for his crimes against humanity.

In January 1986, Morgan, who was Barre's bodyguard before he married his daughter reportedly told Isaaq nomads at a waterhole "if you Isaaqs resist, we will destroy your towns, and you will inherit only ashes".

Morgan (later to be known as the Butcher of Hargeisa) was also responsible for the policy letter written to his father-in-law during his time as the military governor of the north. In this letter which came to be known as 'The Letter of Death', he "proposed the foundations for a scorched-earth policy to get rid of 'anti-Somali germs'".

The policy letter (also known as the Morgan Report) was officially a top secret report to the president on "implemented and recommended measures" for a "final solution" to Somalia's "Isaaq problem". Morgan indicated that the Isaaq people must be "subjected to a campaign of obliteration" in order to prevent them from "rais[ing] their heads again". He continued: "Today, we possess the right remedy for the virus in the [body of the] Somali State." Some of the "remedies" he discussed included: "Balancing the well-to-do to eliminate the concentration of wealth [in the hands of Isaaq]." In addition, he called for "the reconstruction of the Local Council [in Isaaq settlements] in such a way as to balance its present membership which is exclusively from a particular people [the Isaaq]; as well as the dilution of the school population with an infusion of [Ogaden] children from the Refugee Camps in the vicinity of Hargeisa".

More extreme recommendations included: "Rendering uninhabitable the territory between the army and the enemy, which can be done by destroying the water tanks and the villages lying across the territory used by them for infiltration"; and "removing from the membership of the armed forces and civil service all those who are open to suspicion of aiding the enemy – especially those holding sensitive posts".

William Clarke writes that Morgan was appointed as Somali National Army commander-in-chief on 25 November 1990.

After the fall of the government on 26 January 1991 Morgan and Siad Barre fled from Mogadishu to the South-West of the country. In Gedo he regrouped the army. Together with Barre's son General Maslah Mohammed Siad, Mohammed Said Hersi went abroad through Kenya on an arms purchasing mission. According to a report of the Minority Rights Group based in Britain they purchased $27 Million worth of arms and petroleum at various black markets. Mohammed Said Hersi became the chairman of the newly founded Somali National Front (SNF); the remains of the Somali National Army functioned as its militia. The SNF made two efforts (one in April 1991 and the other in April 1992) to recapture the capital Mogadishu. Both efforts failed. The SNF was vanquished by the USC and pushed back to the Kenyan border. It later survived in a diminished form in and around Kismayo. Morgan then tried to unite the Marehan with the other Darod (Ogaden and Majeerteen) to conquer the region around Kismayo. Siad Barre fled to Kenya in April 1992.
On January 8, 1993 Morgan was one of the signatories of agreement reached at the UN-sponsored Informal Preparatory Meeting on National Reconciliation, and the March 1993 Conference on National Reconciliation in Somalia, both in Addis Ababa, Ethiopia. However, fighting continued in the country unabated.

In December 1993, Morgan's troops captured Kismayo, and awaited the departure of Belgian UN peacekeepers who were stationed there. His troops had taken advantage of the UN's preoccupation with Mohamed Farah Aidid and had rearmed and regrouped. Morgan remained in control of Kismayo until 1999. In that period he cooperated with his former enemies, the Majerteen of the SSDF. Operating from Kismayo, Morgan was also active in the Kenyan border area. His militia rarely fought the forces of Siyad Hussein, Col. Omar Jess, and Ahmed Hashi which also operated in this region; instead they devoted most of their energies to preying upon IDPs and refugees. The area around Dobley refugee camp earned a reputation as one of the most dangerous and violent places in the entire region; women gathering firewood in the bush were routinely raped by predatory militiamen, aid convoys were looted, and refugees subjected to extortion and shakedowns.

After the SNF had split up between Marehan and other factions Morgan lost his position as leader of that faction. He then joined the Somali Patriot Movement (SPM), which consisted of Darod tribe militias, the Rahanweyn Resistance Army, and the South Somali National Movement (SSNM). Hersi Morgan was head of the self-created entity Jubaland between September 3, 1998—June 11, 1999.  However he lost the territory to the Juba Valley Alliance (JVA) under Ahmed Warsame in 1999 and only briefly recaptured Kismayo on 6-7 Aug 2001. The town remained in the hands of the JVA until 2006.

Transitional National Government
Morgan was present at the conclusion of the peace talks in Kenya (2002–2004) in which a transitional Somali Transitional National Government (later to become the Transitional Federal Government) was formed. This conclusion, however, was put to risk in September 2004 by the withdrawal of Morgan, who prepared his forces to attack Kismayu, controlled by the JVA which had ousted him in 1999.

Ambassador Kiplagat requested IGAD to impose sanctions against Morgan for withdrawing from the peace process. The JVA and other warlords began to mobilize forces to oppose him. In September there was some fighting at a distance from Kismayu and the local population fled, but within several days the conference facilitators had persuaded Morgan to return to Nairobi and re-join the reconciliation conference, although he was not selected as a member of parliament. According to Amnesty International "his presence at the peace talks, more than any of the other warlords, had highlighted the significance of the issue of impunity and its effect on human rights in the future."

In May 2005 Morgan left Nairobi to pay a short visit with his militia in Mogadishu and talked to representatives of the USC. The battle between the militia and the ICU for the control of the capital would start February 2006. Members of this same USC have been the victims of atrocities by Morgan's troops in 1992. In that year the SNF retook, with assistance of the Kenyan military (in violation of a United Nations Security Council arms embargo), the Gedo region. In October 1992, the SNF captured the town of Bardera, committing atrocities against civilians who were thought to have supported the USC (solely on the basis of their clan identity) and greatly disrupting relief efforts.

In 1991, when Morgan was minister of defense in the Barre government, there still were 54,000 soldiers under his command. Fourteen years later only 1,000 of them remained. Morgan's family lives in the United States.

See also
Somali Civil War
Military of Somalia
Barre Adan Shire Hiiraale

References

External links
 BBC News Information about Hersi Morgan (2002)
 BBC News Information about Hersi Morgan (2004)
 The Butchers of Majertenia, Hargeisa Politically isolated O. M. Nur {OJ}, Toronto, Canada
 Justice for the Atrocities of the 1980s: The Responsibility of Politicians and Political Parties, Rakiya A. Omaar
 Waltzing With Warlords; Will the West Make Martyrs of Thugs in Somalia? Washington Post Jennifer Parmelee, 1993
 IRIN WebSpecial: A Decent Burial - Somalis yearn for justice UN Office for the Coordination of Humanitarian Affairs, 2001

Year of birth missing (living people)
Living people
Government ministers of Somalia
Somali National Front politicians
Somalian faction leaders
Genocide perpetrators